The 392nd Pacific Red Banner Order of Kutuzov District Training Center for junior specialists (Motorized troops) is a training formation of the Russian Ground Forces. It is located in the Khabarovsk area.

It traces its lineage to the 39th Pacific Red Banner Order of Kutuzov Rifle Division, an infantry division of the Red Army formed in 1922, which fought in the Soviet invasion of Manchuria against the Japanese in 1945, and became a motor rifle division in 1957. The division became a training unit in 1962, and became the 392nd District Training Centre in 1987. It then became part of the Russian Ground Forces after the dissolution of the Soviet Union.

History
The division was originally formed on 20 July 1922, on the basis of the 104th Rifle Brigade, of the 35th Rifle Division, as the 1st Transbaikal Rifle Division, but traces its history to the earlier Russian Civil War Red Guard units of the Far East as well. In 1923, the division was redesignated the 1st Pacific Rifle Division in honor of its defeat of White troops on the shores of Pacific and its basing in Primorsky Krai.

The division fought the Chinese during the Sino-Soviet conflict (1929). The future Marshal of the Soviet Union Konstantin Rokossovsky was a regimental commander in the division in the 1930s.

In 1936, the division was renumbered as the 39th Pacific Rifle Division, and was re-raised at Vladivostok, FEMD, during 1937 as part of the reorganisation of the Soviet forces in the Far East. The division fought in the Battle of Lake Khasan with the 39th Rifle Corps in August 1938.

39th RD comprised the 50th, 199th, and 254th Rifle, 15th Artillery, and other smaller sub-units. The division was in the Far East in June 1941. The division was stationed at Tschekunda in the Far East with the 15th Army until April 1943, when it was transferred to the 1st Red Banner Army during August 1943. The 39th fought in the Soviet invasion of Manchuria from 9 August to 3 September 1945 and was awarded the Order of the Red Banner for its actions. The division was with the 59th Rifle Corps, 1st Red Banner Army in the Transbaikal-Amur Military District in 1945. One of its post-war commanders was a Petrov (1957–60).

The division became the 129th Motor Rifle Division in 1957, and in 1962, it became the 129th Motor Rifle Training Division.

In September 1987 it became the 392nd District Training Centre.

Notes

References
Poirer & Connor, p. 278 (some information which is contradicted by later Russian sources removed)
Lenskii 2001
http://www.rkka.ru/handbook/reg/39sd22.htm

Army training units and formations of Russia
Military units and formations established in the 1980s